Judge Ward may refer to:

Henry Galbraith Ward (1851–1933), judge of the United States Court of Appeals for the Second Circuit
Hiram Hamilton Ward (1923–2002), judge of the United States District Court for the Middle District of North Carolina
Horace Ward (1927–2016), judge of the United States District Court for the Northern District of Georgia
Robert Joseph Ward (1926–2003), judge of the United States District Court for the Southern District of New York
T. John Ward (born 1943), judge of the United States District Court for the Eastern District of Texas

See also
Justice Ward (disambiguation)